Pamela Theresa "Pam" Jiles (born February 15, 1954) is a retired American sprinter. She won two gold and two silver medals at the 1975 Pan American and 1976 Olympic Games.

References 

1955 births
Living people
Track and field athletes from New Orleans
American female sprinters
Olympic silver medalists for the United States in track and field
Athletes (track and field) at the 1976 Summer Olympics
Pan American Games gold medalists for the United States
Pan American Games medalists in athletics (track and field)
Athletes (track and field) at the 1975 Pan American Games
Medalists at the 1976 Summer Olympics
Medalists at the 1975 Pan American Games
Olympic female sprinters
20th-century American women